Lateh may refer to:
 Lateh, Langarud (لاته - Lāteh), Gilan Province
 Lateh, Rudsar (لاته - Lāteh), Gilan Province
 Lateh, Mazandaran (لته - Lateh)